Bruno de Oliveira Godoy Paes (born May 3, 1982) is a Brazilian football player who is currently a free agent after playing for Kalloni in the 2011-12 Greek Football League.

References

1982 births
Living people
Brazilian footballers
Brazilian expatriate footballers
Expatriate footballers in Bulgaria
Brazilian expatriate sportspeople in Bulgaria
Expatriate footballers in Greece
Brazilian expatriate sportspeople in Greece
OFC Vihren Sandanski players
Association football defenders